Langdon Hills is a township and former civil parish located in Basildon in Essex, England. 

It is located south of Laindon railway station on the London, Tilbury and Southend line. It is the location of the  Langdon Hills Country Park, which is in the unitary authority of Thurrock.

History
In 1767, Arthur Young commented on the view from Langdon Hills

"…near Horndon, on the summit of a vast hill, one of the most astonishing prospects to be beheld, breaks almost at once upon one of the dark lanes. Such a prodigious valley, everywhere painted with the finest verdure, and intersected with numberless hedges and woods, appears beneath you, that it is past description; the Thames winding thro’ it, full of ships and bounded by the hills of Kent. Nothing can exceed it…"

Until its abolition in 1936, Langdon Hills was a civil parish, part of the Orsett Rural District.

From the 1930s the Dunton Plotlands developed and are now commemorated by a museum.

Community
On 1 April 1936 the parish was abolished to form Thurrock parish, part went to Lee Chapel, it became part of the Thurrock Urban District. In 1974 the Thurrock Urban District was split with most of the Langdon Hills area going to Thurrock District and the smaller but more built up part to the north that was within Basildon New Town going to Basildon District.

The town has a church (St. Johns Church), two schools (Great Berry Primary School and Lincewood School). It has a nature reserve stretching down to Laindon. It also has a Tesco superstore in the towns boundaries. Langdon Hills has a small area as the new district of Great Berry is placed just north of Tesco.
Maple tree lane is however situated inside of Basildon and is not part of any of the above.

References

External links
 Laindon and District Community Archive
 Langdon Living Landscape
 Basildon Borough History - Langdon Hills & Dunton

Villages in Essex
Former civil parishes in Essex
Borough of Basildon